The Idler Wheel Tour is the fourth tour by American singer-songwriter Fiona Apple. Apple announced a small tour in Spring 2012 prompting speculation over a new album. Ahead of her first performance on the tour, Apple confirmed the album. The tour marked Apple's first performances outside of Los Angeles in over five years. Apple kicked off the tour with two performances at the South By Southwest Festival where she debuted three new songs from The Idler Wheel.... Apple's first date at the Lincoln Hall sold out quickly and caused the Lincoln Hall's servers to crash. A second date was announced at Lincoln Hall shortly after. Apple was originally scheduled to perform at the Sixth and I Historic Synagogue on March 21 but was postponed to March 28.

On June 19, the same date The Idler Wheel... released, Apple began the second leg of the tour. The second leg of the tour was much larger. The second leg of the tour kicked off in Ithaca, New York, and wrapped on July 29 at the Hollywood Palladium, and made stops at iconic venues like Nashville's Ryman Auditorium, historic opera houses, and the New York's Governors Ball festival on Randalls Island with Modest Mouse and Beck among the other acts performing. September and October dates were announced on June 18.

On November 20, 2012, Apple posted a handwritten letter addressed to her fans on her Facebook page, in which she announced the cancellation of her South American tour due to the failing health of her dog, Janet.

Tour

Box office score data

Personnel
Fiona Apple – Vocals, piano
Charley Drayton – Drums, percussion
Amy Wood – Percussion
Zac Rae – Keyboard
Sebastian Steinberg – Bass
Blake Mills – Guitar

Source: Fiona Apple: The Billboard Cover Story

References

2012 concert tours
Fiona Apple